In Modern English, it is a singular, neuter, third-person pronoun.

Morphology 
In Modern English, it has only three shapes representing five word forms:
 it: the nominative (subjective) and accusative (objective) forms. (The accusative case is also called the "oblique".)
 its: the dependent and independent genitive (possessive) forms
 itself: the reflexive form
Historically, though, the morphology is more complex.

History

Old English
Old English had a single third-person pronoun – from the Proto-Germanic demonstrative base *khi-, from PIE *ko- "this" – which had a plural and three genders in the singular. The modern pronoun it developed out of the neuter, singular. The older pronoun had the following forms:

This neuter pronoun, like the masculine and feminine ones, was used for both people and objects (inanimate or abstract). Common nouns in Anglo-saxon had grammatical genders, which were not necessarily the same as the gender of the person(s) referred to (though they tended to accord with the endings of the words).

The word , (which meant "female", ancestor of "wife" as in "fishwife"), is also neuter. ("Man") was grammatically male, but meant "a person", and could, like , be qualified with a gender. (variant , ancestor of "woman") meant "female person" and was grammatically masculine, like its last element, and like  (variant , "male person").

Nouns for inanimate objects and abstract concepts also had (grammatical) genders. Mark Twain parodied this grammatical structure (which still exists in German) by rendering it literally into modern English:

About half of the world's languages have gender, and there is a continuum between those with more grammatical gender (based on word form, or quite arbitrary), and those with more natural gender (based on word meaning). The concept of natural gender was beginning to develop in Old English, occasionally conflicting with the established grammatical gender. This development was, however, mostly to take place later, in Middle English.

Middle English (1066-1400s)
In the 12th century, it started to separate and appear without an h. Around the same time, one case was lost, and distinct pronouns started to develop, so that by the 15th century (late Middle English), the forms of it were as follows: 

 Nominative: (h)it
 Accusative: (h)it / him
 Genitive: his
 Reflexive:(h)it self. Also -selfe, -selve(n), -silf, -sijlfe, sometimes without a space.

During the Middle English period, grammatical gender was gradually replaced with natural gender in English.

Modern English (a bit before 1550-present)
Middle English gradually gave way to Modern English in the early 16th century. The hit form continued well into the 16th century but had disappeared before the 17th in formal written English. Genitive its appeared in the later 16th century and had taken over by the middle of the 17th, by which time it had its modern form. "Hit" remains in some dialects in stressed positions only; some dialects also use "it", not "its", as a possessive.

Gender 
It is considered to be neuter or impersonal / non-personal in gender. In Old English, (h)it was the neuter nominative and accusative form of hē. But by the 17th century, the old gender system, which marked gender on common nouns and adjectives, as well as pronouns, had disappeared, leaving only pronoun marking. At the same time, a new relative pronoun system was developing that eventually split between personal relative who and impersonal relative which. As a result some scholars consider it to belong to the impersonal gender, along with relative which and interrogative what.

Syntax

Functions 
It can appear as a subject, object, determiner or a predicative complement. The reflexive form also appears as an adjunct. It very seldom appears as a modifier.

 Subject: <u>It'''</u>s there; it being there; its being there; it allows for itself to be there. Object: I saw it; I pointed her to it; It connects to itself. Predicative complement:  In our attempt to fight evil, we have become it; It took more than ten years it, to fully become itself. Determiner: I touched its top. Adjunct: It did it itself. Modifier: They were the it crowd. Dummy it 
A dummy pronoun is one that appears only for syntactic reasons and has no semantic value. One use of it is as a dummy pronoun (see also there) as in it's raining or it's clear that you understand.

In Old English, a subject was not required in the way it is today. As the subject requirement developed, there was a need for something to fill it with verbs taking zero arguments. Weather verbs such as rain or thunder were of this type, and, as the following example shows, dummy it often took on this role.Gif on sæternesdæg geðunrað, þaet tacnað   demena and gerefena cwealm

If   on  saturn's-day    thunders,  that portends judges' and  sheriffs'   death

If it thunders on Saturday, that portends the deaths of judges and sheriffsBut these were not the only such verbs. Most of the verbs used without a subject or with the dummy it belong to one of the following semantic groups: (a)  Events or happenings (chance, happen, befall, etc.)
 (b)  Seeming or appearance (seem, think, become, etc.)
 (c)  Sufficiency or lack (lack, need, suffice, etc.)
 (d)  Mental processes or states (like, list, grieve, please, repent, rue, etc.)And examples still remain, such as the expression suffice it to say.

We see the same use of dummy it in cleft constructions, such as it's obvious that you were there. 

 Dependents 
Pronouns rarely take dependents, but it is possible for it to have many of the same kind of dependents as other noun phrases.

 Relative clause modifier: That's not the it that I meant; *That's not it that I meant. Determiner: That's not the it that I meant; *That's not the it. Adverb phrase external modifier: not even itself Semantics It is used to denote an inanimate physical object, abstract concept, situation, action, characteristic, and almost any other concept or being, including, occasionally, humans.It is usually definite and specific, but it can also have no referent at all (See Dummy it). It can be debatable whether a particular use is a dummy it or not (for instance: "Who is it?" —"It's me!").

Samuel Taylor Coleridge proposed using it in a wider sense in all the situations where a gender-neutral pronoun might be desired:

The children's author E. Nesbit consistently wrote in this manner, often of mixed groups of children: "Everyone got its legs kicked or its feet trodden on in the scramble to get out of the carriage." This usage (but in all capital letters, as if an acronym) also occurs in District of Columbia police reports.

Some people use it as a gender-neutral pronoun.

 Pronunciation 
According to the OED, the following pronunciations are used:

 Popular culture 

 Stephen King's 1986 book It is about a shape shifting, malevolent entity that often manifests as a clown.
 In games of tag, the person trying to tag others is known as it.

See also
 Generic antecedents
 Gender-specific pronoun
 English personal pronouns

References

External links

 William Malone Baskervill and James Witt Sewel, An English Grammar , 1896.
 On some Philological Peculiarities in the English Authorized Version of the Bible. By Thomas Watts, Esq.
 'It', The American Heritage Dictionary of the English Language'', Fourth edition, (Boston: Houghton Mifflin Company, 2000).

Modern English personal pronouns